Velacota (possibly from Aymara wila blood, blood-red, quta lake, "red lake") is mountain in the Vilcanota mountain range in the Andes of Peru, about  high. It is located in the Cusco Region, Quispicanchi Province, in the districts of Marcapata and Ocongate. Velacota lies southeast of Jolljepunco and southwest of  Ancahuachana.

References 

Mountains of Peru
Mountains of Cusco Region
Glaciers of Peru